The following is the current leaderboard for career runs batted in (RBIs) KBO League Korean baseball.

Players with 1,000 or more RBIs

 Stats updated as of October 12, 2022.

See also
 List of KBO career hits leaders
 List of KBO career batting average leaders
 List of KBO career home run leaders
 List of KBO career stolen bases leaders
 List of Major League Baseball career runs batted in leaders

Notes

References

Korean baseball articles